Società Sportiva Dilettantistica Vivi Altotevere Sansepolcro is an Italian association football club located in Sansepolcro, Tuscany. It currently plays in Serie D.

History
It was founded in 1921 and refounded in 1978 and 2014.

The Unione Sportiva Sansepolcro, founded in 1921, failed in 1982 after two consecutive championships played in Serie C2. The legacy of the old society is collected by the Gruppo Sportivo Borgo, who was born in 1978 as a society of pure academy. In 1983 the team is entered in the championship of the Terza Categoria, which won in the 1984–1985 season, promoting to the Seconda Categoria. In 1985–1986 G.S. Borgo was promoted to the Prima Categoria. In 1987–1988, thanks to the 2nd place y in Prima Categoria, gained promotion to Promozione.

The team achieved promotion to Eccellenza in 1991–1992, while in 1993–1994 was promoted to National Amateur Championship or Serie D. Since then the team plays continuously in Serie D.

On 4 July 2000 the team was renamed Altotevere Calcio, part of a project to create a single company based in Sansepolcro, Citta di Castello and with the achievement of professional categories. For various reasons, after only two seasons Altotevere Calcio returns to the old name Sansepolcro Calcio.

On 20 June 2009 the Sansepolcro won the Scudetto Junior by beating in the final on penalties Savona.

In the 2010–11 Serie D season Sansepolcro gained access to the play-off for promotion in Lega Pro Seconda Divisione, but eventually was eliminated.

In the 2016–17 season it plays in Serie D Group G.

Colors and badge
Its colors are white and black.

References

External links
 Official homepage

Football clubs in Tuscany
Association football clubs established in 1921
Serie C clubs
1921 establishments in Italy